Adrian Hong Chang (b. 1983 or 1984 in Tijuana), is an activist of Korean descent, U.S. residence, and Mexican citizenship, notable for his human rights activism, and leadership in a North Korean provisional government based in Los Angeles.

Hong serves as managing director of the political group Free Joseon and was previously head of Pegasus Strategies LLC, "a strategic advisory firm." His commentary calling attention to North Korean human rights abuses has been published in many American newspapers and magazines, including The Christian Science Monitor. He is a co-founder of the Street Symphony, a classical music group based in Los Angeles.

Early life and education 
Hong's father, Joseph, was a Christian missionary and taekwondo champion, who immigrated to Tijuana, B.C., Mexico. He taught martial arts in Tijuana under the name 'El Tigre'. Hong was born in Tijuana in either 1983 or 1984, making him a Mexican national by birth. In 1991, at the age of seven, he immigrated along with his family to Chula Vista, California.

Hong attended Yale University.

Co-Founder of Liberty in North Korea 
Hong was the co-founder and executive director of Liberty in North Korea (LiNK), an international NGO devoted to human rights in North Korea. In May 2006, LINK helped arrange the first asylum to be given to North Korean refugees by the US. In 2009, his work with Liberty in North Korea appears to have ended, according to a statement from that group in 2019. In 2009, Hong was selected as a TED fellow, and was appointed as an Alfred Wolfers Fellow at Yale University.

Arrest and deportation from China 
Hong was arrested and deported from China for his efforts to help North Korean refugees living in the country illegally.

Humanitarian work in Libya and Los Angeles 
In 2011, he traveled to Libya to "help open the door for the evacuation of tens of thousands of injured civilians and provide them with urgent medical care in Jordan." He also co-founded the group Street Symphony with another TED fellow, Robert Vijay Gupta, in order to bring "live classical music to mentally ill individuals living in deeply impoverished, disenfranchised communities in Los Angeles".

Awards and recognition 
In 2012, Hong was the co-recipient of a National Endowment for the Arts grant.

Involvement in 2019 North Korean embassy in Madrid incident 

In February 2019, Hong was charged by Spanish authorities along with other perpetrators for invading North Korean embassy and assaulting the staff during the 2019 North Korean embassy in Madrid incident, during which he used the aliases 'Mathew Chao' and 'Oswaldo Trump'.

Free Joseon and Hong have denied that this was a raid, and assert that its members were invited into the embassy compound by one or more staff members. Rather than a raid, the North Korean embassy incident was reportedly an attempted defection made to appear as a kidnapping to protect the defectors' family members in North Korea.

See also 
Human rights in North Korea
Phillip Buck
TED Fellows
Ahn Changho

References

Bibliography
Hope, Bradley (2022). The Rebel and the Kingdom: The True Story of the Secret Mission to Overthrow the North Korean Regime. Crown. ISBN 9780593240656.

External links
TED Fellow - Adrian Hong
Town Hall interview with Adrian Hong 
LiNK - Liberty in North Korea 

Human rights in North Korea
Living people
Year of birth missing (living people)
Place of birth missing (living people)
American people of Korean descent
Experts on North Korea
Mexican activists
Mexican people of Korean descent
People from Tijuana